Hyla Bristow Stallard  (28 April 1901 – 21 October 1973), published as H. B. Stallard and familiarly known as Henry Stallard, was an English middle-distance runner and ophthalmologist.

Stallard was educated at Sherborne School (1914–1919), an independent school for boys in Sherborne, Dorset, before going up to Gonville and Caius College, Cambridge, where he studied medicine,<ref name="bjr">{{cite web|url=http://bjr.birjournals.org/cgi/reprint/76/904/283-a.pdf|title=Book review, Radiotherapy of interblobular and orbital tumors|date=April 2003|publisher=British Journal of Radiology|access-date=2009-08-01}}</ref> and was a contemporary of Harold Abrahams.

Athletics
Stallard was a member of the University Athletics team in 1920, 1921 and 1922. He was part of the Oxbridge team that set a world record in the 4×880 yd relay in 1922.

Stallard competed at the 1924 Summer Olympics held in Paris; he won the bronze medal in the 1500 metres (time 3:55.6) and finished fourth in the 800 metres (time 1:53.0), despite sustaining a stress fracture in the right foot in the 1500 m heats. He was portrayed by Daniel Gerroll in the 1981 Oscar-winning movie Chariots of Fire''.

Stallard is the only athlete that won the Amateur Athletic Association of England titles over 440 yd (1925), 880 yd (1924), and mile (1923). He withdrew at the last minute from the 1926 AAA Championships after a copious blood donation to a patient at his hospital.

Medical career
Besides athletics, Stallard was a prominent doctor. As ophthalmic surgeon to St Bartholomew's Hospital and Moorfields Eye Hospital, he pioneered cobalt plaque radiotherapy for the treatment of ocular tumours, particularly in children. He was elected as president of the Ophthalmological Society in 1972.

References

British male middle-distance runners
Olympic bronze medallists for Great Britain
Athletes (track and field) at the 1924 Summer Olympics
Olympic athletes of Great Britain
People educated at Sherborne School
Alumni of Gonville and Caius College, Cambridge
1901 births
1973 deaths
Sportspeople from Leeds
Medalists at the 1924 Summer Olympics
Olympic bronze medalists in athletics (track and field)